Reuilly-Sauvigny is a commune in the Aisne department in Hauts-de-France in northern France.

Geography 
The village is located in Condé-en-Brie, in the south of the Aisne department, bordering on the Marne department. About 10 kilometres to the east of the commune is Château-Thierry, which is located on a hillside in Marne.

History 
Two surrounding fords meant it was easiest to cross la Marne at the top of the commune, making it a strategic point during the two World wars, during which Reuilly was very heavily damaged.

Heraldry 
The Reuilly-Sauvigny coat of arms is emblazoned with:
Green with a golden sword, three lioncubs stitched on a silver waving fabric

Sights 
 Église Saint Blaise, dating back to the 13th century

Population

See also
Communes of the Aisne department

References

Communes of Aisne
Aisne communes articles needing translation from French Wikipedia